Nariinteel is a sum (district) of Övörkhangai Province in southern Mongolia. The sum centre is 135 km to the West from Övörkhangai aimag centre Arvaikheer and 565 km from the Mongolia capital Ulan Bator. In 2008, its population was 3,736.

The Bayanteeg coal mine and the settlement are approx. 40 km to the South from the sum centre.

References 

Districts of Övörkhangai Province